Since 1993, the Royal Australian Navy has operated four Australian-designed and built Landing Craft, Vehicle and Personnel (similar in size and concept to the World War II LCVP) from the landing ship, heavy , replenishment oiler , LSD HMAS Choules and Pacific support vessel ADV Reliant. These aluminum craft were built by Geraldton Boat Builders and can carry up to 36 personnel or a Land Rover with a half-ton trailer. They are maintained for the RAN by the firm DMS Maritime. As of 2022, T4 and T5 are carried by ADV Reliant.

References

Amphibious warfare vessels of the Royal Australian Navy
Naval ships of Australia
Landing craft